Los Mochis is a coastal city in northern Sinaloa, Mexico. It serves as the municipal seat of the municipality of Ahome. As of the 2010 census, the population was 362,613, which was 61 percent of the municipality's population.

Los Mochis  is the western terminus of the Chihuahua-Pacific Railroad (El Chepe), which passes through the scenic Copper Canyon. This railway was approved by President Porfirio Díaz as a trade route linking the cattle markets in Kansas City with the nearest port on the Pacific Ocean, Topolobampo.

Today the North Pacific irrigation region (Sinaloa-Sonora) in which the Fort Valley is the largest district and is the principal agricultural area of Sinaloa, containing over 70% of all irrigated land and producing sugar cane, cotton, rice, flowers, and many types of vegetables. The valley is one of the largest producers of mangoes in Mexico. Air transportation is provided by Los Mochis Airport. Nearby Topolobampo is the second largest natural deepwater port in the world, and is known for its commercial fishing and increasingly important role in shipping.

History 

Los Mochis (from mochim, plural of mochic, Cahitan for "earth turtle" and used to refer to the flowers of Boerhavia coccinea) was founded in 1893 by a group of American utopian socialists who were adherents of Albert Kimsey Owen, an American civil engineer who built the first irrigation ditches in the valley. The colony, organized under the principles of utopian socialism, survived for 31 years. Albert K. Owen, the American civil engineer who came to do studies for the construction of a railway, was enchanted by Ohuira Bay and imagined the city of the future, where railways and shipping lines converged to ship throughout the world. Today, the port city of Topolobampo continues to be developed and may one day reach Owen's dream.

The city was founded by a businessman named Benjamin F. Johnston, who came to make a fortune in the cultivation of sugarcane. Benjamin F. Johnston arrived at Topolobampo attracted by Owen's city project. Johnston saw an opportunity to exploit resources such as sugar cane and with Edward Lycan, who had been linked to Zacarías Ochoa, owner of a Trapiche (raw sugar mill) named "El Águila", initiated the construction of a sugar mill. Ochoa died suddenly, and Johnston seized businesses that Lycan and Ochoa founded. "El Águila Sugar Refining Company" later became "United Sugar Company."

In 1898, Johnston laid the first stone of the sugar mill and drove the rapid growth of the city around it. The first harvest was welcomed in the year 1903.

Johnston was a very powerful and influential businessman, so powerful that he drew the street plans for Los Mochis — a modern city with wide and straight streets. It was not recognized as a city until 1903 along with Topolobampo. On 20 April 1903 a decree was founded by the mayor of Los Mochis, during the state government of Francisco Cañedo. In 1916, establishing the town of Ahome and since 1935 the municipal seat of the latter is in the city of Los Mochis. It is currently the commercial center of Valle del Fuerte and its radius of influence extends from the southern part of the neighboring state of Sonora and to the municipalities of El Fuerte, Sinaloa, Choix and Guasave in Sinaloa.

The economic development of the city began with the sugar industry, but in recent decades, its progress rests on the high-tech agriculture practiced throughout the northwestern region of Mexico.

A group of enthusiastic people in la Villa de Ahome, under the name of "separatist," fought to create a municipality outside the hegemony of El Fuerte. It achieved its objectives until 5 January 1917 when the mayor came to El Fuerte to install a new city hall in which he presided Ramon C. López who had been appointed by the state governor Francisco Cañedo.

The municipality of Ahome was created by decree of the Local Legislature dated 20 December 1917, being governor of the state Gral. Ángel Flores, and was appointed head of the municipality of La Villa de Ahome.

In 1918 Florencio A. Valdés, was the first elected mayor.

The City Council Ahome preceded by Modesto G. Castro decided to make the move to the town of Los Mochis, justifying that this population had grown so much that already exceeded several times to La Villa de Ahome.

The City Council Ahome, in a decision dated 1 April 1935, allowed the change to the header, and the State Legislature passed it through another decree issued on May 10 next, which was published in the Official Journal of State the 30th day of the month.

The transfer took place without major problems right away and offices were installed in the house owned by Don Fco. Beltran, at the corner of Hidalgo and Zaragoza next to the local occupied by the former Sindicatura.

The old town of Ahome, to remain laggard in the process of the region, had been relegated to second place. Since then the city of Los Mochis, as the town of Ahome whole have had major changes in both economic and social policy have remained constant progress to the municipality.

Climate
Climate in Los Mochis is semi-arid wet and dry (BSh), bordering on arid (BWh). Winters are very warm, reaching  in the day, even though the lowest temperature recorded was  during January 1971. Rainfall concentrates in the summer: it is common to see thunderstorms and even occasional hurricanes in August and September, but winters are dry with almost no rainfall, though on 29 December 1978  fell. The highest daily rainfall, however, totaled  from a hurricane that hit the area on 8 October 1985 .

Sports
Los Mochis is known for its sports culture and large, high-quality sporting facilities (Ciudades Deportivas) intended to promote participation in sports. It has two large sporting facilities  that have running tracks, pools, tennis courts, baseball fields and a football stadium with a capacity of 11,000.

The city is home to the Mexican Pacific League's Cañeros de Los Mochis baseball club. The city's football team is called the Murciélagos de Los Mochis, and its basketball team is known as the Pioneros.

Professional boxing
With many World Champions and undefeated boxers, Los Mochis is considered one of Mexico's best boxing's cities.

Transport

The Copper Canyon Railway provides daily passenger service to Chihuahua, Chihuahua in north-central Mexico. Freight service on this route is provided by the interstate rail conglomerate Ferromex, or Ferrocarril de Mexicano, which also links to the port city of Topolobampo.

The city is on Mexican Federal Highway 15, the main north-south route from Nogales to Mexico City.

The city's airport offer domestic flights, mainly to Mexico's largest cities and is served by several airlines.

Notable people
Jorge "Travieso" Arce, first Mexican to win World Championships in four weight divisions and former WBO Super Bantamweight Champion.
Francisco Arce Armenta, boxer, title contender in the Featherweight division.
Sergio Arias, footballer for C.D. Chivas USA and World Champion with the Mexican U-17 National team.
Luis Ayala, former baseball professional pitcher that played for numerous teams in the National and American Leagues.
Miguel Beltrán Jr., boxer, title contender in the Lightweight division.
Edwin Borboa, footballer for the Potros Neza.
Omar Bravo, footballer for Club Deportivo Guadalajara and the Mexico national team.
Juan Castro, shortstop for a number of teams in MLB.
Hugo Cázares, two weight division World Champion boxer and current WBA Super Flyweight Champion.
Daniel Cota, boxer, title contender in the Heavyweight division.
Jorge Cota, Light Middleweight boxer with a record of 28-3.
Antonio DeMarco, boxer, former WBC Lightweight Champion.
Carlos Fierro, footballer for the Chivas de Guadalajara. Winner of the 2011 FIFA U-17 World Cup
Denisse Guerrero, lead singer of the Mexican electropop band Belanova.
Laura Harring, Mexican actress and former Miss USA (1985).
Teddy Higuera, former pitcher for Milwaukee Brewers in Major League Baseball.
Joel Huiqui, footballer for the Monarcas Morelia and the Mexico national team.
Enrique Jackson, politician and candidate for the PRI presidential primaries.
Roberto Jordan, 1960s singer
Francisco Labastida, former PRI candidate to the 2000 Mexican presidential election.
Rosalva Luna Ruiz, Nuestra Belleza México 2003.
Mahonri Montes, professional boxer with a record of 36-9-1.
Fernando "Cochulito" Montiel, boxer, five-time three weight division world champion.
Andrés Muñoz, pitcher for the Seattle Mariners.
Javier Orozco, footballer for the Santos Laguna.
Juan Carlos Sánchez Jr., boxer, title contender in the Super Flyweight division.
Humberto "Zorrita" Soto, three division World Champion boxer and current WBC Lightweight champion.
Humberto Soto, undefeated Heavyweight boxer.
Jesús Soto Karass, boxer, title contender in the Welterweight division.
José Félix Jr., professional Lightweight boxer with a record of 36-4-1.
José Luis Soto Karass, boxer in the Light Welterweight division.
Hugo Ruiz, former WBA bantamweight champion.
Carlos Urías, boxer, title contender in the Welterweight division.
Alma López, MFA, artist, lecturer

Sister cities
Bellflower, California

References

External links

Gobierno municipal de Ahome

 
Populated places in Sinaloa
Gulf of California
Populated places established in 1893